The following highways are numbered 315:

Canada
 Manitoba Provincial Road 315
 New Brunswick Route 315
 Prince Edward Island Route 315
 Quebec Route 315

China
 China National Highway 315

Costa Rica
 National Route 315

India
 National Highway 315 (India)

Japan
 Japan National Route 315

United States
  Interstate 315 (unsigned)
  Arkansas Highway 315
  Connecticut Route 315
  Florida State Road 315 (former)
  Georgia State Route 315
  Iowa Highway 315 (former)
  Kentucky Route 315
  Louisiana Highway 315
  Maryland Route 315
 Maryland Route 315 (former)
  Mississippi Highway 315
  Montana Secondary Highway 315
  New Mexico State Road 315
 New York:
  New York State Route 315
  County Route 315 (Erie County, New York)
  Ohio State Route 315
 Ohio State Route 315C (unsigned)
  Pennsylvania Route 315
  South Carolina Highway 315
  Tennessee State Route 315
 Texas:
  Texas State Highway 315
  Farm to Market Road 315
  Utah State Route 315
  Vermont Route 315
  Virginia State Route 315
  Wyoming Highway 315

Other areas:
  Puerto Rico Highway 315
  U.S. Virgin Islands Highway 315